Christine Meeusen (b. ), also known as "Sister Kate", is a farmer and businessperson in Merced, California. Her business specializes in high-CBD, low-THC preparations made from on-premises grown cannabis.

Biography
Christine Meeusen initially adopted the persona of a nun named "Sister Kate" in participating in the Occupy Movement in 2010, and continues to use the Sister Kate moniker and dress in the production of cannabis medicine.

She produces the medicine in a semi-cooperative operation in Merced, California, Sisters of the Valley, with her partner Darcy "Sister Darcy" Johnson and other temporary workers. Meeusen, who does not identify with Christianity, considers the production to be a spiritual activity, whose rituals and incorporate New Age practices and environmentalism, "borrowing" from Native American practices.

References

External links
The Stoned Immaculate: Meet the Weed Nuns of the San Joaquin Valley, Vice, January 2016

American cannabis activists
American women business executives
American business executives
Businesspeople in the pharmaceutical industry
People from Merced, California
Businesspeople in the cannabis industry
Year of birth uncertain
20th-century births
Living people
21st-century American women